Bramwell Additions Historic District is a national historic district  located at Bramwell, Mercer County, West Virginia.  The district originally included 151 contributing buildings, 8 contributing sites, 5 contributing structures, and 2 contributing objects. The boundary increase added 27 contributing buildings and 1 contributing structure.  The non-contiguous district encompasses formerly independent coal mining oriented communities now incorporated into Bramwell.  These communities include Freeman, Ramey Addition, Simmons, and Cooper.  The district is characterized by company houses built as residences for miners.

It was listed on the National Register of Historic Places in 1995.  A boundary increase was added in 2005.

References

Historic districts in Mercer County, West Virginia
National Register of Historic Places in Mercer County, West Virginia
Victorian architecture in West Virginia
Historic districts on the National Register of Historic Places in West Virginia